Breeze often refers to:
 A gentle to moderate wind
 Sea breeze, an onshore afternoon wind, caused by warm air rising over the land in sunny weather

Breeze or The Breeze may also refer to:
 Breeze block a concrete masonry unit made from recovered fly-ash

Places
 Breeze Center, a shopping center in Songshan District, Taipei, Taiwan
 Breeze Creek, a river in California
 Breeze Lake, a lake in California
 Breeze Nan Jing, shopping mall in Songshan District, Taipei, Taiwan
 Gulf Breeze, a city in Santa Rosa County, Florida

People
Breeze (rapper), American rapper
Alan Breeze (1909–1980), English singer of the British dance band era
Andrew Breeze (born 1954), British academic
Ben Breeze (born 1974), English rugby union player
Brady Breeze (born 1997), American football player
Carl Breeze (born 1979), British auto racing driver
Claude Breeze (born 1938), Canadian figurative painter
David Breeze (born 1944), British archaeologist, teacher and scholar
Ernest Breeze (1910–1984), English footballer
Evan Breeze (1798–1855), Welsh poet and schoolmaster
Jared Breeze (born 2005), American child actor
Jean "Binta" Breeze (1956–2021), Jamaican dub poet and storyteller
Joe Breeze (born 1953), American bicycle framebuilder, designer and advocate
Lynn Breeze, British illustrator and author.
Maddie Breeze, British sociologist and lecturer 
Marc Breeze (born 1987), Welsh rugby union player
Mark Breeze or DJ Breeze, British disc jockey
Matthew Breeze (born 1972), Australian football referee
Michaela Breeze (born 1979), British weightlifter
Roger Breeze (1946–2016), English veterinary scientist 
Samuel Breeze (1772–1812), Welsh Baptist minister
Tyler Breeze (born 1988), Canadian pro wrestler
William Breeze (born 1955), American author and publisher on magick and philosophy

Arts, entertainment, and media

Music
 Breezin', an album by George Benson
 Breezing (album), an album by Sonny Red
 The Breeze: An Appreciation of JJ Cale, an album by Eric Clapton

Press and publishing
Breeze Publications, publisher based in Lincoln, Rhode Island
Daily Breeze,  daily newspaper published in Hermosa Beach, California, United States
 The Breeze (newspaper), the official student newspaper of James Madison University in Harrisonburg, Virginia

Radio
In Australia
 The Breeze (Australia), an oldies and classic hits radio network broadcasting to remote Queensland and New South Wales, Australia
 Macquarie Sports Radio 1278 in Melbourne, former branding from 1992 to 1993
In Canada
 CHLG-FM in Vancouver, British Columbia
 CKRA-FM in Edmonton, Alberta
 CKUL-FM in Halifax, Nova Scotia
In England
 The Breeze (radio network), a small network of radio stations operating in South and South West England
 The Breeze (radio station), a pair of former radio stations in southern England
In New Zealand
 The Breeze (New Zealand radio station), a radio station in New Zealand
In the United States
 The Breeze, an iHeartRadio music service featuring soft adult contemporary songs
 KBEB in Sacramento
 KISQ in San Francisco
 WCON (AM) in Cornelia
 WGXI in Plymouth, Wisconsin
 WISX in Philadelphia from 2018 to 2022
 WMSX in Buffalo
 WPBZ-FM in Rensaller
 WWZY in Long Branch, New Jersey, former branding from 2003 to 2013
 WXXF in Loudinville

Television
Breeze TV, New Zealand music TV channel that was launched by The Breeze radio station

Brands and enterprises
 Breeze, a brand of mobile phones marketed by Pantech
 Breeze Airways an airline in the United States that began operating in 2021
 Breeze detergent
Breeze Energy, was a UK-based retail electricity and gas supplier specialising in sustainable energy

Sports
DC Breeze, an open professional ultimate team based in the District of Columbia

Software
 Breeze, mobile banking application on the iPhone developed by Standard Chartered Bank
 Macromedia Breeze, former name of Adobe Acrobat Connect presentation software

Transport
 Breeze, a brigantine sailing ship (see National Maritime Museum, New Zealand)
 Breeze Airways an airline in the United States that began operating in 2021
 Breeze or Breeze Card, a stored-value smart card for Metropolitan Atlanta Rapid Transit Authority fare collection in Atlanta, Georgia
 Carnival Breeze, a planned Carnival Cruise Lines cruise ship
 Plymouth Breeze, a mid-sized car sold from 1996 to 2000
Solar Wings Breeze, a British hang glider design
 The Breeze, a marketing name for the Spirit of Ontario I ferry between Rochester, New York and Toronto, Ontario
 The Breeze, the fixed route bus service of the Cape Cod Regional Transit Authority
 The Breeze, the bus service in the North County Transit District in San Diego County, California

Other uses
 Horse-fly, various strong-bodied dipterous insects of the family Tabanidae

See also
 Breezy (disambiguation)
 Brees (surname), includes a list of people with the name